Yael Danon (Panama City, January 16, 2006) is an Israeli-Panamanian singer who was a winning contestant on Israel's Got Talent.  While on a visit to family in Israel in December 2018, her father suggested that she audition for IGT. She sang a cover of Coldplay's "Fix You" at the audition and a cover of Oasis's "Wonderworld" during the show. After her victory on IGT, Danon performed at the Knesset (the Israeli parliament).

Danon is known for her cover of "To Change" and for her covers of the songs "Hello" by Adele, "Fix You" by Coldplay, and "Wonderwall" by Oasis. In November 2015, Danon began posting videos of her singing through Instagram and her YouTube channel, as well as performing in musicals.

Danon appeared on Israel's Got Talent in December 2018. She won the Youth Category on the show's two-part special dedicated to young talents with her performance of "Wonderwall" at the mere age of 12.

Discography

References

External links
Yael Danon

2006 births
Living people
21st-century Panamanian women singers
21st-century Panamanian singers